A champagne cocktail is an alcoholic cocktail made with sugar, Angostura bitters, Champagne, brandy, and a maraschino cherry as a garnish. It is one of the IBA official cocktails.

A recipe for the cocktail appears as early as "Professor" Jerry Thomas' Bon Vivant's Companion (1862), which omits the brandy or cognac and is considered to be the "classic" American version. Harry Johnson was one of the bartenders who revived the model by adding other fruit to the mix.

References

Cocktails with Champagne
Cocktails with brandy
Cocktails with Angostura bitters